The EHF Women's Champions Trophy was an official competition for women's handball clubs of Europe.

History
It was organized annually by the European Handball Federation (EHF) from 1994 to 2008. Until 2007 it was known as the Women's European Club Championship or the Super Cup. In 2008 was the last edition.

The Champions Trophy was played as a four team tournament between the winners of the Champions League, EHF Cup and Cup Winners' Cup plus an additional invited club.

Winners

Statistics

By country

References 

 
European Handball Federation competitions
Women's handball competitions
Recurring sporting events established in 1994
Recurring sporting events disestablished in 2008